The Güferhorn is a mountain in the Lepontine Alps, located between the valleys of Vals and Hinterrhein in Graubünden. At 3,379 metres above sea level it is the highest summit of the Lepontine Alps lying east of the Rheinwaldhorn. The northern side of the massif is covered by the Güfergletscher, a 2 kilometres long glacier. It lies above 2,600 metres on the east side of a ridge starting at the summit of the Güferhorn and separating the valleys of Länta and Canaltal, both converging at the Zervreilasee, south of Vals.

References

External links
Güferhorn on Hikr.org

Mountains of the Alps
Alpine three-thousanders
Mountains of Switzerland
Mountains of Graubünden
Lepontine Alps
Rheinwald
Vals, Switzerland